Rhysodesmini is a tribe of flat-backed millipedes in the family Xystodesmidae. There are about 11 genera and at least 90 described species in Rhysodesmini.

Genera
 Boraria Chamberlin, 1943
 Caralinda Hoffman, 1978
 Cherokia Chamberlin, 1949
 Erdelyia Hoffman, 1962
 Gonoessa Shelley, 1984
 Gyalostethus Hoffman, 1965
 Lourdesia Shelley, 1991
 Parvulodesmus Shelley, 1983
 Pleuroloma Rafinesque, 1820
 Rhysodesmus Cook, 1895
 Stenodesmus DeSaussure, 1859

References

External links
 NCBI Taxonomy Browser, Rhysodesmini

Polydesmida
Arthropod tribes